Come Back to Sorrento (Italian: Torna... a Sorrento) is a 1945 Italian musical comedy film directed by Carlo Ludovico Bragaglia and starring Gino Bechi, Adriana Benetti and Aroldo Tieri. It takes its name from a popular song.

The film's sets were designed by Alberto Boccianti.

Cast
 Gino Bechi as Mario Bianchi
 Adriana Benetti as Paola
 Aroldo Tieri as Il fidenzato di Paola
 Guglielmo Barnabò as Il padre di Paola
 Marcella Rovena as La madre di Paola
 Camillo Pilotto 
 Arturo Bragaglia 
 Loris Gizzi 
 Marcello Giorda

References

Bibliography 
 Orio Caldiron. Il Paradosso Dell'autore. Bulzoni, 1999.

External links 
 

1945 films
Italian musical comedy films
1945 musical comedy films
Films directed by Carlo Ludovico Bragaglia
Italian black-and-white films
1940s Italian-language films
1940s Italian films

it:Torna... a Sorrento